The 2016 Tour of Slovenia was the 23rd edition of the Tour of Slovenia cycling stage race. It was scheduled from 16 to 19 June.

The winner of overall classification was Rein Taaramäe. The selection was made on Stage 1 to Trije Kralji.

Schedule

Participating teams
Nineteen (19) teams participated in the 2016 edition of the Tour of Slovenia.

Stages

Stage 1
16 June 2016 — Ljubljana to Koper,

Stage 2
17 June 2016 — Nova Gorica to Golte,

Stage 3
18 June 2016 — Celje to Celjska Koča, individual time trial (ITT)

Stage 4
19 June 2016 — Rogaška Slatina to Novo Mesto,

Classification leadership

Final standings

General classification

Points classification

Mountains classification

Young riders classification (U23)

Team classification

References

External links
 Official website

Tour of Slovenia
Tour of Slovenia
Tour of Slovenia